The 3rd LINE TV Awards was an awarding ceremony presented by LINE TV Thailand, giving recognition to the Thai online entertainment industry in the fields of music, television and drama for their achievements in the year 2019.

The awards night was held at the Royal Paragon Hall, Siam Paragon, Bangkok, Thailand on Wednesday, 19 February 2020.

Awards 
Winners are listed first and highlighted in bold:

Major awards

Special awards

Multiple awards and nominations

References 

2020
Line
Line